Xanthopleura flavocincta is a moth in the subfamily Arctiinae first described by Félix Édouard Guérin-Méneville in 1844. It is found in French Guiana.

References

Arctiinae